Yelizaveta Andreyevna Lavrovskaya ( – February 4, 1919) was a Russian mezzo-soprano praised for her dramatic performances of operatic arias and her sensitive interpretations of lieder.

An acquaintance of composer Pyotr Ilyich Tchaikovsky, she suggested that he compose an opera based on Alexander Pushkin's verse-play Eugene Onegin. Tchaikovsky followed her suggestion; the result was the composer's finest opera.

Life and career
Born in Kashin, Lavrovskaya studied first at the Elizabeth Institute in Moscow under Fenzi, then at the Saint Petersburg Conservatory under Henriette Nissen-Saloman. The Grand Duchess Yelena Pavlovna, the German-born aunt of Tsar Alexander II of Russia and royal sponsor of both the Russian Musical Society and the Saint Petersburg Conservatory, was impressed by Lavrovskaya's performance in a student presentation of Christoph Willibald Gluck's opera Orfeo ed Euridice. She sent Lavroskaya to Paris in 1867 to study with French mezzo-soprano Pauline Viardot. Upon her return in 1868, Lavroskaya was engaged by the Saint Petersburg Imperial Opera, making her professional debut as Vanya in Mikhail Glinka's opera A Life for the Tsar. Lavrovskaya later sang Ratmir in Ruslan and Lyudmila, along with many other mezzo-soprano roles, including Carmen and Mignon. She stayed with the company four years, after which she went to Paris for further studies with Viardot and to further develop her concert career. After a series of European tours, she was re-engaged by the Saint Petersburg Imperial Opera, singing there from 1878 to 1902. She also appeared at the Bolshoi Theatre in Moscow during the 1890 season.

Lavrovskaya was also well known as a recitalist, not only in Russia but also in Western Europe, singing at the Monday Popular Concerts at the Crystal Palace in London in 1873 and at the Paris Exhibition of 1878. In 1870, she premiered Tchaikovsky's song, "None but the lonely heart" in Moscow, following it with its Saint Petersburg premiere the following year during an all-Tchaikovsky concert hosted by Nikolai Rubinstein; the latter was the first concert devoted entirely to Tchaikovsky's works. Lavrovskaya was much admired by Tchaikovsky, who dedicated his Six Romances, Op. 27 to her, and by Mily Balakirev at whose Russian Musical Society and Free Music School concerts she was a regular guest artist. Sergei Rachmaninoff dedicated two of his Op. 15 songs to Lavrovskaya, "She is lovely as the noon" and "In my soul" ["Love's flame"].

In 1877, during a conversation with Tchaikovsky on possible opera subjects, Lavrovskaya suggested Onegin. "The idea seemed wild and I didn't reply", the composer later wrote his brother Modest. "Later, while dining alone at an inn, I recalled Onegin, fell to thinking about it, next began to find Lavrovskaya's idea a possibility, then was carried away by it, and by the end of the meal had made up my mind. Straightway I ran off to track down a Pushkin. I found one with difficulty, set off home, read it through with delight, and passed an utterly sleepless night, the result of which was the scenario of a delightful opera on Pushkin's text."

In 1871, Lavrovskaya married Prince Tsertelev. In 1888, she became professor of singing at the Moscow Conservatory. Tchaikovsky considered her to be an "excellent" teacher. She died in Saint Petersburg (then called Petrograd) in 1919.

Lavrovskaya's recorded voice

Notes

References

Sources
 Bertensson, Sergei and Jay Leyda, with the assistance of Sophia Satina, Sergei Rachmaninoff—A Lifetime in Music (Washington Square, New York: New York University Press, 1956)). ISBN n/a.
 Brown, David, Tchaikovsky: The Early Years, 1840–1874 (New York: W.W. Norton, 1978). .
 Brown, David, Tchaikovsky: The Crisis Years, 1874–1878, (New York: W.W. Norton, 1983). .
 Garden, Edward, ed. Stanley Sadie, "Lavrovskaya [Lawrowska], Yelizaveta Andreyevna", The New Grove Dictionary of Music and Musicians, Second edition (London: Macmillan, 2001), 29 vols. .
 Spencer, Jennifer, ed. Stanley Sadie, "Lavrovskaya [Lawrowska], Yelizaveta Andreyevna", The New Grove Dictionary of Music and Musicians (London: Macmillan, 1980). .
 Spencer, Jennifer and Elizabeth Formes, ed. Stanley Sadie, The New Grove Dictionary of Opera (London: Macmillan, 1992). .
 Warrack, John, Tchaikovsky'' (New York: Charles Scribner's Sons, 1973). SBN 684-13558-2.

External links
 Entry in Russian Composers and Musicians. Retrieved 28 March 2009.
 Tchaikovsky Research article on Yelizaveta Lavrovskaya.

1845 births
1919 deaths
Operatic mezzo-sopranos
Russian mezzo-sopranos
19th-century women opera singers from the Russian Empire